Revenger is a 2016 science fiction novel by British author Alastair Reynolds. It is unconnected to any of Reynolds's previous works, and is the first book in the Revenger Trilogy.  A sequel, entitled Shadow Captain was published on 10 January 2019, and a third and final book in the trilogy, Bone Silence, was published in 2020.

Revenger won the 2017 Locus Award for Best Young Adult Book, and was a finalist for the 2018 Philip K. Dick Award.

Synopsis
Tens of millions of years in the future, sisters Adrana and Arafura ('Fura') Ness are skilled bone readers—the primary method by which spaceships communicate with one another.  Their skill at bone reading leads them to be taken on as apprentices aboard Monetta's Mourn, a spaceship captained by Pol Rackamore.  Rackamore and his crew engage in the practice of finding ancient technological artifacts, called "baubles". While in search of these artifacts, Monetta's Mourn is attacked by the infamous space pirate Bosa Sennen, separating the sisters and leaving Fura adrift on a ship in empty space.

Reception
Revenger has been labelled by some reviews as a young adult novel, although it has not been marketed as such by the publisher.  Reynolds addresses this on his blog, saying he hopes the novel "is a straightforward SF novel that also happens to be accessible, and perhaps accessible to somewhat younger readers."

Mark Yon of SFFWorld.com describes the novel as "an entertaining pirate romp ... with a touch of Firefly."  Publishers Weekly calls Revenger a "remarkably creative, resonant space opera."

References

2016 British novels
2016 science fiction novels
Space opera novels
Novels by Alastair Reynolds
Victor Gollancz Ltd books